Test preparation (abbreviated test prep) or exam preparation is an educational course, tutoring service, educational material, or a learning tool designed to increase students' performance on standardized tests. Examples of these tests include entrance examinations used for admissions to institutions of higher education, such as college (e.g. the SAT and ACT), business school (the GMAT), law school (the LSAT or LNAT), medical school (the MCAT), BMAT, UKCAT and GAMSAT and graduate school (the GRE) and qualifying examinations for admission to gifted education programs.

Preparation options 
There are many resources and services on which students may draw as they prepare for standardized tests, including: 
 Courses: Many test preparation courses are designed to expose students to the breadth of topics tested on the relevant exam and guide them through the process of studying.
 Flashcards: Index cards imprinted with information used as a study aid to reinforce memory retention.
 Mind Maps: Mind maps allow students to visually organize relevant concepts and information, showing relationships among pieces of the whole.
 Mock exams: Mock exams are practice exams that help students prepare for the real exam. They are intended to give students a clear indication of the structure and content of the actual exam, as well as a snapshot of their current performance.
 Study groups: Studying as group facilitates collaboration and exposes students to different perspectives on the material.
 Study Guides: Various organizations and individuals produce published materials that students can incorporate into their preparation. 
 Tutors: A tutor is a person with whom students work one-on-one to improve academic performance, in this case on an exam.

Resource providers
Most companies and educators that offer test preparation services also offer traditional (hard copy) such as books and printed materials and technology or online-based learning tools, such as content accessible on hand-held devices such as smartphones, tablets and laptops. So do most test makers, publishers of self-help, instructional and educational materials, and makers of hardware and software.

Test makers
 ACT, Inc. - publisher of the ACT
 American Council on Education (ACE) - publisher of the GED test 
 Association of American Medical Colleges (AAMC) - publisher of the MCAT test
 College Board - publisher of the SAT test
 Educational Testing Service (ETS) - publisher of the GRE and TOEFL tests
 Elsevier - publisher of the  HESI exam
 Graduate Management Admission Council (GMAC) - publisher of the GMAT
 Harcourt Assessment - publisher of the Miller Analogies Test (MAT)
 Law School Admissions Council (LSAC) - publisher of the LSAT test
 National Restaurant Association - publisher of the ServSafe
 Testing Mom - online test prep for parents of gifted education; testing and skill building

Third parties
 Barron's Educational Series - publisher of books and educational materials
 CliffsNotes - publisher of study guides
 The Complete Idiot's Guides - publisher of instructional reference books
 For Dummies - publisher of instructional/reference books 
 Gary Gruber - educator and author
 McGraw-Hill - publisher of books and educational materials 
 Peterson's - publisher of books and educational materials
 SparkNotes - publisher of study guides
 Study Notes - publisher of study guides
 Texas Instruments - technology company that offers test-maker approved calculators and a variety of test preparation and test-taking tools

Criticism
Some test-preparation programs have been proven to help students improve test scores,  but others may have little effect.

Test preparation for the SAT and the GMAT is a highly lucrative field.

A lot of people have criticism towards exams and testing in the primary and high school environment, the number one type of testing in Australia that receives criticism is NAPLAN. Parents and teachers have put forward numerous cases stating the stress it is having on children and how pointless it is.

See also
 Cram school
 Australian education system
 ATAR

References

School examinations
Standardized tests
Student assessment and evaluation
Preparedness